Alida Chelli (23 October 1943 – 14 December 2012) was an Italian singer, and actress. She was mainly known for her appearances in stage musicals.

Biography
Born in Carpi as Alida Rustichelli, Chelli was daughter of composer Carlo Rustichelli and sister of composer Paolo Rustichelli. She achieved her first success as singer, with the song "Sinnò me moro", which opens the 1959 film Un maledetto imbroglio.

Then, Chelli achieved a major fame on stage, starring in a number of successful musical comedies such as Rugantino (1978, together with Enrico Montesano), Cyrano (1979, with Domenico Modugno), and Aggiungi un posto a tavola (1990, with Johnny Dorelli).  
She has also appeared in many films, mainly comedies, and TV-shows.

She married Italian actor Walter Chiari in 1969, and together they had one son, television presenter Simone Annicchiarico (Chiari's real surname). After their 1972 divorce, Chelli had a relationship with television presenter Pippo Baudo. She died in Rome at 69, after a long illness.

Filmography

Films

Television

References

External links 

 
 
 

1943 births
Italian film actresses
2012 deaths
Italian stage actresses
Italian television actresses
People from Carpi, Emilia-Romagna
20th-century Italian actresses
20th-century Italian women singers
Musicians from the Province of Modena